Splicing factor, arginine/serine-rich 5 is a protein that in humans is encoded by the SFRS5 gene.

References

Further reading